Carlos "Sonny" García Domínguez III (born September 16, 1945) is a Filipino businessman and former chief executive of Philippine Airlines who served as the Secretary of Finance under the Duterte administration. He had previously held the position of Secretary of Agriculture and Minister of Natural Resources under the Corazon Aquino administration. Prior to his appointment to President Duterte's Cabinet, he had served as executive director of PTFC Redevelopment Corp., as independent director of Alsons Consolidated Resources, and as director of United Paragon Mining Corp. His family owns Marco Polo Hotel in Davao City, one of the top hotels in southern Mindanao.

Early life and education 
Domínguez comes from a prominent Zamboangueño family in Davao City. Born on September 16, 1945, in Zamboanga, he is the son of Carlos Domínguez II and Virginia Ubeda García. His grandfather Carlos Domínguez Sr. was a pre-World War II manager of the Bank of the Philippine Islands (BPI) in Zamboanga. He grew up in Davao and attended elementary and high school at the Ateneo de Davao University where he was a classmate of President Rodrigo Duterte. He moved to Manila for his college studies at the Ateneo de Manila University. Domínguez graduated with a Bachelor of Science degree in Economics in 1965 and received a Master of Business Administration from the same university in 1969. He also pursued post-graduate studies in California, U.S. where he completed the Executive Program from Stanford University's Graduate School of Business in 1982.

Career and businesses
Earlier in his career, Domínguez joined the Bank of the Philippine Islands after finishing a short executive course from Stanford. He was President of the BPI Agricultural Development Bank for two years before being invited by President Corazon Aquino to join her new government. He assumed the leadership of the Ministry of Natural Resources in 1986 and the Department of Agriculture in 1987 while also serving as Director of the government-owned Land Bank of the Philippines.

After leaving government service in 1989, Domínguez entered the tobacco, real estate, retail, mining and energy industries and served in various executive positions in companies such as the Retail Specialist, Inc., Philippine Tobacco Flue-Curing and Redrying Corp., Baesa Redevelopment Corp., Halifax Capital Resources, and United Paragon Mining Corp.  He joined the Philippine Airlines in 1993 and served as its Chairman until 1995.

In his long business career after government, Domínguez also worked as Chairman and Director of RCBC Capital Corp. (House of Investments) and President of Shangri-la Plaza Corp., Northern Mindanao Power Corp., Easycall Communications Philippines, Lafayette Philippines, Transnational Diversified Group, Central Azucarera Don Pedro and as Independent Director of Roxas Holdings. From 2001 to 2003, he served as Director of Meralco. He was also recently involved in the 2016 presidential campaign of his childhood friend and high school classmate Rodrigo Duterte as his fundraising and campaign finance manager.

Finance Secretary

Dominguez returned to government service on July 1, 2016, as he became President Duterte's Secretary of Finance, and serves as one of Duterte's economic managers in implementing the DuterteNomics. As Finance Secretary, Dominguez serves as a member of the Monetary Board of the Bangko Sentral ng Pilipinas, the Governor for the Philippines in the Asian Development Bank (ADB), the Governor for the Philippines at the World Bank, and Alternate Governor for the Philippines at the International Monetary Fund. His post also makes him ex-officio Chairman of seven various government-owned institutions which are the Land Bank of the Philippines, the Philippine Deposit Insurance Corporation (PDIC), the Philippine Export-Import Credit Agency, the National Power Corporation (NAPOCOR/NPC), the Home Guaranty Corporation, the National Transmission Corporation (TransCo), and the Power Sector Assets and Liabilities Management Corporation (PSALM).

Under Dominguez's leadership, the Philippines maintained strong investor and consumer confidence, and solid investment and credit grades from Standard & Poor's, Moody's, Fitch,  the Japan Credit Rating Agency. Dominguez led the administration's ten-point economic agenda promoting flexible measures, boosting government revenues, and advocating fiscal incentives and tax reform measures to attract and boost foreign investments and local jobs within the economy, which includes the passage and implementation of the Tax Reform for Acceleration and Inclusion Law (TRAIN) Law and the Corporate Recovery and Tax Incentives for Enterprises (CREATE) Law. Dominguez also led the application of the National ID System for fast identification and transactions, and the Personal Property Security Act (PSPA), as well as the tobacco tax reform bill and the Sin Tax Reform Law, which will be used for raise the government's health agendas, including the Universal Health Care (UHC) Law, by increasing taxes on alcohol, tobacco cigarettes and vapes. Dominguez also showed his support for the rice tariffication law, citing that the law boosted funds for the agricultural sector while cutting down prices of rice from an average of ₱49 to ₱39 per kilo.

Dominguez also helped fund the country's $170 Billion Build! Build! Build! Infrastructure Program through loans from other countries, such as Japan, South Korea, China, the European Union, the United States, the World Bank, the International Monetary Fund, the Asian Infrastructure Investment Bank, and the Asian Development Bank while increasing the government's infrastructure spending from 1-4% from 1993-2017 to over 6% in 2017. Dominguez also oversaw the country's record low debt to GDP ratio of 39.6% in 2019, which was quickly overturned on 2020 and 2021, as the country's debts drew a dramatic sharp increase which reached 54.6% in 2020 and 60.5% of GDP in 2021, due to increased spending from the COVID-19 pandemic, which caused a decrease of government revenues. Dominguez continued making measures on combating climate change and also oversaw the renovation of the Department of Finance building in Roxas Boulevard, which features green initiatives, such as a modernized glass facade and sewage treatment facility. Dominguez also persisted on making the Philippines in a more stable fiscal position by combating corruption and modernizing the country's online transactions, through the Ease of Doing Business Act to reduce red tape measures, and rehabilitating the Bureau of Customs, which earned a total of ₱645.76 billion in 2021 while also expanding the country's estate tax amnesty for another two years.
Dominguez is also pursuing his plan of implementing higher taxes to increase the revenues set to be used to pay the country's debts, through the study of the carbon tax, tax charges on cryptocurrencies, the removal of all dispensations from the current 12-percent value-added tax payments, as well as another rounds of excise taxes on alcohol, cigarettes, vapes, and sugary beverages.

Personal life
Domínguez is married to Cynthia "Ball" Andrews, the daughter of the late Col. Antonio Andrews of the PAF Flying School Class of 1949, and one of the pioneers of the Philippine Air Force. They have four children, Rafael, Mary Edwina, Ignacio and Xavier.

References 

|-

|-

1945 births
20th-century Filipino businesspeople
Filipino chairpersons of corporations
Living people
Secretaries of Finance of the Philippines
Secretaries of Agriculture of the Philippines
Secretaries of Environment and Natural Resources of the Philippines
People from Zamboanga City
People from Davao City
Ateneo de Manila University alumni
Stanford Graduate School of Business alumni
Corazon Aquino administration cabinet members
Duterte administration cabinet members
21st-century Filipino businesspeople